The boys' doubles tournament of the 2020 European Junior Badminton Championships was held from 2 to 7 November. Fabien Delrue and William Villeger from France clinched this title in the last edition.

Seeds
Seeds were announced on 16 October.

 Egor Kholkin / Georgii Lebedev (final)
 Wiliiam Kryger Boe / Mads Vestergaard (champions)
 Jacobo Fernandez / Ruben Garcia (quarterfinals)
 Alejandro de Pablo / Gabriel Fernandez (third round)
 Sergej Lukic / Mihajlo Tomic (semifinals)
 Kilian Ming-Zhe Maurer / Matthias Schnabel (semifinals)
 Christian Faust Kjær / Marcus Rindshøj (quarterfinals)
 Gustav Andree / Tobias Rudolf (second round)

Draw

Finals

Top half

Section 1

Section 2

Bottom half

Section 3

Section 4

References

External links 
Main Draw

2020 European Junior Badminton Championships